The 1989 Survivor Series was the third annual Survivor Series professional wrestling pay-per-view (PPV) event produced by the World Wrestling Federation (WWF, now WWE). It took place on Thanksgiving Day on November 23, 1989, at the Rosemont Horizon in the Chicago suburb of Rosemont, Illinois. This was the first Survivor Series event in which the teams bore explicit names and consisted of four (instead of five) members.

The main event was a four-on-four Survivor Series match in which The Ultimate Warriors (The Ultimate Warrior, The Rockers (Shawn Michaels and Marty Jannetty), and Jim Neidhart) defeated The Heenan Family (Bobby Heenan, The Colossal Connection (André the Giant and Haku) and Arn Anderson).

Production

Background
Survivor Series is an annual gimmick pay-per-view (PPV), produced every November by the World Wrestling Federation (WWF, now WWE) since 1987. In what has become the second longest running pay-per-view event in history (behind WWE's WrestleMania), it is one of the promotion's original four pay-per-views, along with WrestleMania, Royal Rumble, and SummerSlam, which were dubbed the "Big Four". Like the previous two years, the third event in the Survivor Series chronology only featured Survivor Series matches, which are tag team elimination matches. While those two previous events had included three matches that pitted teams of five wrestlers against each other and one that pitted five tag teams against each other, all five of the Survivor Series matches at the 1989 event were teams of four wrestlers against each other. It was scheduled to be held on Thanksgiving Day on November 23, 1989, at the Rosemont Horizon in the Chicago suburb of Rosemont, Illinois.

Storylines
The card included matches that resulted from scripted storylines, where wrestlers portrayed heroes, villains, or less distinguishable characters in scripted events that built tension and culminated in a wrestling match or series of matches. Results were predetermined by WWF's writers, with storylines produced on their weekly television shows.

A major feud heading into Survivor Series was between The Ultimate Warriors (WWF Intercontinental Heavyweight Champion Ultimate Warrior and The Rockers (Shawn Michaels and Marty Jannetty) and Jim Neidhart vs. The Heenan Family, The Colossal Connection (André the Giant and Haku) and The Brain Busters (Arn Anderson and Tully Blanchard). Bobby Heenan was a very popular heel manager, who led many heel wrestlers to championship victories in the WWF and his clients feuded with all babyface wrestlers. Ultimate Warrior had been placed in a feud with Heenan's client Rick Rude which began at Royal Rumble when Warrior won by fan reaction over Rude in a posedown. Rude followed by attacking him. They feuded with each other until the summer of the year, in which they exchanged the Intercontinental Heavyweight Championship with each other. The Rockers were in a feud with Brain Busters, that had also begun since the beginning of the year. The feud began on January 30, 1989 edition of Prime Time Wrestling where The Brain Busters faced The Rockers. In the match, The Brain Busters narrowly defeated the Rockers as Anderson held down Marty Jannetty's leg as Blanchard pinned him. The Rockers and The Brain Busters faced each other in a rematch on March 11 Saturday Night's Main Event XX which resulted in a double countout. They were added to the main event of Survivor Series in opposing teams.

Dusty Rhodes began a feud with Big Boss Man in mid-1989, when Rhodes came to the aid of a preliminary wrestler during the July 22nd episode of WWF Superstars of Wrestling (taped June 28), stealing the Big Boss Man's nightstick and handcuffs in the process. Later in the same episode of WWF Superstars of Wrestling, Rhodes was a guest on The Brother Love Show, where he proclaimed that "no one was afraid of the Boss Man anymore." Rhodes captained the Dream Team, while the Big Boss Man captained The Enforcers. Akeem, one half of The Twin Towers, defeated Brutus Beefcake in a King of the Ring tournament qualifying match on October 14, leading to a feud between Beefcake and Akeem. Beefcake joined Dusty's Dream Team while Akeem was scheduled to be a member of Enforcers. Tito Santana and Rick Martel, former Strike Force teammates had been feuding with each other since WrestleMania V, where Martel turned heel by abandoning Santana during their match against Brain Busters (Arn Anderson and Tully Blanchard). At SummerSlam, Martel and The Fabulous Rougeaus (Jacques and Raymond Rougeau) defeated Santana and The Rockers (Shawn Michaels and Marty Jannetty). Martel became a member of The Enforcers while Santana was added to The Dream Team. The Honky Tonk Man and The Red Rooster wrestled a series of house show matches in the fall of 1989, with Honky winning most of these encounters. Honky was added to The Enforcers, while the Red Rooster joined The Dream Team.

Randy Savage turned heel in early 1989, breaking up The Mega Powers. He defeated Jim Duggan later that same year to win the title of "King of Wrestling", beginning a feud between Duggan and himself. Greg Valentine and Ronnie Garvin had been feuding since a match on December 30, 1988 in Madison Square Garden (MSG) which Valentine won by grabbing the tights for leverage. On April 22, 1989 episode of Superstars, Garvin defeated Valentine in a match. On the following edition of Superstars, they both faced each other in a retirement match in which the loser could not wrestle anymore in WWF. Valentine won the match, sending Garvin into retirement. Garvin became a referee for the WWF. During this time, he punched several wrestlers who physically provoked him, including Valentine in the course of his match against Jimmy Snuka, and he was suspended after the match. Valentine was also involved in a feud with Hercules, which culminated at SummerSlam where Valentine defeated Hercules by pinning him using the ropes for leverage. Garvin was the guest ring announcer for the match, and not only did he verbally mock Valentine during the introduction, but he also announced Hercules as the winner by disqualification. Valentine was so furious that he demanded Garvin be reinstated as a professional wrestler, and his request was accepted. Garvin and Hercules were included as members of 4x4s at Survivor Series, and Valentine was added as a member of King's Court. Dino Bravo was involved in a feud with Bret Hart. At Royal Rumble, Jim Duggan, Hart and Jim Neidhart defeated Bravo and The Fabulous Rougeaus in a two out of three falls match, so Bravo became a member of King's Court at Survivor Series and Hart became a member of 4x4s.

Hulk Hogan starred in the WWF-financed professional-wrestling movie No Holds Barred as the protagonist, Rip. Tommy Lister Jr. portrayed Rip's arch rival Zeus in the movie, who is defeated by Rip. It turned out into a rivalry that took place in the WWF. Lister was billed as Zeus, who wanted to take revenge of the movie from Hogan in real-life. He debuted on May 27, 1989 Saturday Night's Main Event XXI before Hogan's WWF World Heavyweight Championship title defense against Big Boss Man in a steel cage. Boss Man's manager Slick introduced him. Zeus attacked Hogan during Hogan's entrance. The feud culminated at SummerSlam where Hogan and Brutus Beefcake defeated Randy Savage and Zeus. Zeus was scheduled to become a part of Million $ Team against Hogan's Hulkamaniacs team at Survivor Series. At WrestleMania V, Ted DiBiase attempted to steal Jake Roberts' snake Damien during Roberts' match against André the Giant beginning a rivalry between Roberts and DiBiase. Roberts defeated DiBiase's manager Virgil on Superstars but after the match, DiBiase injured him and sidelined him for months. Roberts returned in late 1989 and signed to become a part of Hogan's Hulkamaniacs team against DiBiase's Million $ Team. Demolition (Ax and Smash) were pushed as a heel tag team in the WWF in 1988 under the tutelage of Mr. Fuji. A stronger and powerful babyface tag team The Powers of Pain (The Warlord and The Barbarian) debuted in the summer of 1988 and challenged Demolition for the WWF Tag Team Championship. At Survivor Series, Fuji caused Demolition to get eliminated in a Survivor Series match resulting in a double turn as Powers of Pain turned heels and Demolition turned babyfaces. At WrestleMania V, Demolition defeated Powers of Pain and Mr. Fuji in a handicap match to retain the tag titles, culminating in Demolition joining Hulkamaniacs at Survivor Series and Powers of Pain joining Million $ Team in Survivor Series.

At SummerSlam, Roddy Piper interfered in Rick Rude's WWF Intercontinental Heavyweight Championship title defense against Ultimate Warrior and distracted Rude, causing Rude to lose the title to Warrior. This led to Rude and Piper captaining teams against each other at Survivor Series. Rude's team was dubbed "Rude Brood," and Piper's team was dubbed "Roddy's Rowdies". Jimmy Snuka became a part of Rowdy's Rowdies and Mr. Perfect became a part of Rude Brood. The Bushwhackers (Bushwhacker Butch and Bushwhacker Luke) feuded with The Fabulous Rougeaus (Jacques Rougeau and Raymond Rougeau) in early 1989. This led to their WrestleMania V encounter where Bushwhackers won, leading to Bushwhackers joining Roddy's Rowdies and Rougeaus joining Rude Brood.

Event

Before the event aired live on pay-per-view, Boris Zhukov defeated Paul Roma in a dark match. The opening included superstars expressing what they were thankful for, followed by a rundown of the card narrated by Vince McMahon. The first Survivor Series match was between The Dream Team (Dusty Rhodes, Brutus Beefcake, The Red Rooster and Tito Santana) and The Enforcers (Big Boss Man, Bad News Brown, Rick Martel and The Honky Tonk Man). Originally, Boss Man's tag team The Twin Towers partner Akeem was scheduled to be a part of The Enforcers but was replaced by Brown. Rick Martel and Tito Santana, two former Strike Force partners and current rivals began the match. Martel pinned Santana with a roll-up, eliminating Santana, leaving Dream Team with three members. Sapphire made another appearance in the audience, after appearing the previous week on TV cheering on Dusty Rhodes in a match against Akeem. Like the previous year, Bad News Brown walked out on his team after arguing with team captain Big Boss Man and getting counted out. Both teams continued with three members each until Brutus Beefcake pinned Honky Tonk Man after a high knee, eliminating Honky and leaving Enforcers with only two members – Boss Man and Martel. Martel entered but failed to eliminate Beefcake. Instead, Beefcake pinned Martel with a roll-up, eliminating him and leaving Enforcers' captain Boss Man as the remaining member. He managed to pin Red Rooster after a Boss Man Slam. He fought the opposing Dream Team's captain Dusty Rhodes. The two captains had a battle with each other, which Rhodes won after he pinned Boss Man with a flying crossbody. Dream Team won with Rhodes and Beefcake as the survivors.

The second Survivor Series match was between The King's Court (Randy Savage, Canadian Earthquake, Dino Bravo and Greg Valentine) and 4x4s (Jim Duggan, Bret Hart, Ronnie Garvin and Hercules). Canadian Earthquake was a replacement for The Widowmaker, after Windham left the company in October due to his family’s involvement in a counterfeit scandal. Hercules and Earthquake began the match. Earthquake hit Hercules an Earthquake Splash and pinned Hercules to eliminate him, leaving 4x4s with three members. Greg Valentine came next against the team captain of the 4x4s, Jim Duggan. Duggan used his bigger size on Valentine and hit him with a three-point stance charging clothesline and pinned Valentine to eliminate him, leaving King's Court with three members too. Dino Bravo brawled with Ronnie Garvin. Bravo hit Garvin a side slam and pinned Garvin to eliminate him, leaving 4x4s with two members – Duggan and Bret Hart. Hart used his high-flying ability but fell victim to a Savage Elbow by opposing team King's Court captain Randy Savage. Savage followed by pinning Hart and eliminating him, leaving 4x4s with their captain Duggan. Duggan was able to fend himself against King's Court, who were all three. However, Savage's valet Queen Sherri interfered which distracted Duggan. Duggan went to the outside to chase her and got counted out. King's Court won the match with Savage, Earthquake, and Bravo as the survivors. After the match, Duggan grabbed his 2x4 and attacked Savage, Earthquake and Bravo with it.

The main event was a third Survivor Series match between The Hulkamaniacs (WWF World Heavyweight Champion Hulk Hogan, WWF Tag Team Champions Demolition (Ax and Smash) and Jake Roberts and Million Dollar Team Ted DiBiase, Powers of Pain (The Warlord and The Barbarian) and Zeus. Zeus shoved the referee at the 3:21 minute mark, so he was disqualified and got eliminated, leaving Million Dollar Team with three members. Ax and Warlord battled each other. Ax dominated Warlord until Powers of Pain's manager Mr. Fuji distracted him. Warlord took advantage and pinned Ax to eliminate him, leaving Hulkamaniacs with three members to even the score. Ax's Demolition partner Smash entered the match and battled it out with Warlord's Powers of Pain partner Barbarian. Smash tried to take revenge of Ax's elimination from Barbarian but was pinned after a flying clothesline, getting eliminated and leaving Hulkamaniacs with two members – Jake Roberts and Hulk Hogan. Warlord and Barbarian double-teamed Hogan, so they were disqualified and eliminated, leaving Million Dollar Team's captain Ted DiBiase as the only member remaining in the match. Roberts got the upper hand on DiBiase until DiBiase's manager Virgil distracted Roberts. With his feet on the ropes for leverage, DiBiase pinned and eliminated Roberts. It all came down to the team captains, with Hogan hitting a leg drop on DiBiase, pinning him to win the match and become the sole survivor for his team.

The fourth Survivor Series match was between The Rude Brood (Rick Rude, Mr. Perfect and The Fabulous Rougeaus (Jacques and Raymond Rougeau) and Roddy's Rowdies (Roddy Piper, Jimmy Snuka and The Bushwhackers (Bushwhacker Butch and Bushwhacker Luke). The high-flying Jimmy Snuka and Jacques Rougeau began the match with Snuka eliminating Jacques with a Superfly Splash, leaving The Rude Brood with three members. Jacques' brother and Fabulous Rougeaus partner Raymond battled opposing team captain Roddy Piper. Piper hit Raymond with a piledriver and pinned Raymond to eliminate him, leaving Rude Brood with only two members – Mr. Perfect and team captain Rick Rude. Perfect had been pushed as an undefeated wrestler since joining WWF in 1988. He pinned Bushwhacker Butch with a roll-up to eliminate him, leaving Rowdy's Rowdies with three members. Butch's Bushwhackers partner Bushwhacker Luke battled Rude, but unluckily was hit with a Rude Awakening and got pinned, getting eliminated and leaving Rowdy's Rowdies with two members. With both teams down to two members captains Rude and Piper battled each other until both were counted-out, leaving only Perfect from The Rude Brood and Snuka from Roddy's Rowdies. Snuka used his high-flying techniques on Perfect but was unable to pin him. Perfect hit Snuka a Perfectplex to win the match and become the sole survivor for The Rude Brood.

The fifth Survivor Series match was between The Ultimate Warriors (WWF Intercontinental Heavyweight Champion The Ultimate Warrior, The Rockers (Shawn Michaels and Marty Jannetty) and Jim Neidhart) and The Heenan Family (manager Bobby Heenan, The Colossal Connection (André the Giant and Haku) and Arn Anderson). Arn Anderson's Brain Busters partner Tully Blanchard was originally scheduled to be a part of The Heenan Family but was fired from the WWF on November 1 for failing a drug test. He was replaced by Bobby Heenan. At first, only Neidhart, Jannetty and Michaels were introduced for the face team, and as soon as the Rockers entered the ring, Neidhart attacked Heenan while Michaels and Jannetty went after Anderson and Haku. André went after the faces, attacking at will until Warrior ran out, jumped into the ring and, after sending him reeling with a series of clotheslines, knocked André to the floor. André was counted out at the 26-second mark, giving the Warrior's team a quick 4-3 advantage. Later, Neidhart and Anderson were brawling when, after Anderson was knocked to the floor, Haku snuck up from behind and struck Neidhart with a thrust kick to score the pin. Anderson and Haku used a series of double-team moves to wear down Janetty, and eventually, Heenan was tagged in to score the easy pin and give the Heenan Family a 3-2 edge. After Haku missed with a flying crossbody, Michaels used a crossbody of his own to pin Haku. At this point, Anderson began showing signs of frustration with Heenan but was still able to eliminate Michaels after hitting him with a Spinebuster. Anderson held a short-lived advantage over Warrior, but the beginning of the end for the heels came when Warrior whipped Anderson into Heenan (who was standing on the apron), knocking the latter to the floor. Warrior pinned Anderson after hitting him with a gorilla press drop–big splash combination. As Heenan began regaining his senses and arguing with Anderson, thinking him to be walking out on the match, Warrior snuck around ringside and snuck up on Heenan, who realized what had happened. Warrior grabbed Heenan, whipped him across the ring and after knocking him down with a shoulder tackle, hit him with a big splash to score the pin and become the sole survivor for his team. Warrior, after briefly posing in the ring with his Intercontinental Heavyweight Championship belt, knocked down a groggy Heenan in the aisle, shortly before the pay-per-view signed off.

Aftermath
The main event confrontation between Hulk Hogan and Zeus was set up for a special late-December pay-per-view event called No Holds Barred: The Match/The Movie, in which actor Tommy Lister – in his "Zeus" character – was paired with Randy Savage (his tag-team partner from SummerSlam 1989) and Hogan and Brutus "the Barber" Beefcake were reunited for a special tag team steel cage match, which Hogan and Beefcake won.

Arn Anderson's and Tully Blanchard's final WWF appearance would be the following Saturday (November 25, 1989, taped October 31, 1989) on Saturday Night's Main Event in a best two out of three falls match against The Rockers.  Heenan "fired" his team for not following his direction and left ringside while Anderson/Blanchard lost their match.  Due to the failed drug test, WCW did not hire Blanchard but did bring Anderson back and appeared on WCW television two weeks after his final WWF appearance.

The Ultimate Warrior was successful in the WWF's mid-card division in 1989, so his match at Survivor Series was run last to give the event a Warrior-themed ending, although Hogan's match was promoted as the main event contest. The biggest match of Warrior's career was at WrestleMania VI where he defeated Hulk Hogan to win the WWF World Heavyweight Championship in a title vs. title match in which Warrior's WWF Intercontinental Heavyweight Championship was also on the line.

André the Giant and Haku had teamed together occasionally prior to the 1989 Survivor Series as members of the Heenan Family, but this was their first high-profile match as a tag team. After Survivor Series, the two formally formed a tag team known as The Colossal Connection, in part to fill a void in the Heenan Family left by the imminent departure of Anderson and Blanchard, but also to prolong the ailing Andre's career – the effects of his real-life acromegaly were starting to take their toll – by including him in a team in which the younger, healthy Haku would handle most of the wrestling. On December 13, 1989, André and Haku would win the WWF Tag Team Championship by defeating Demolition at a television taping in Huntsville, Alabama, and would hold on to the titles until Demolition gained revenge at WrestleMania VI, defeating The Colossal Connection and setting in motion André's face turn in what was the final WWF match of his career.

Results

Survivor Series elimination matches

Other on-screen personnel

References

External links
Official 1989 Survivor Series website

1989
Professional wrestling in the Chicago metropolitan area
1989 in Illinois
Events in Rosemont, Illinois
1989 WWF pay-per-view events
November 1989 events in the United States